Trichy road Flyover also known as Ramanathapuram-Sungam flyover is a 3.15 km long flyover  in the city of Coimbatore . It is designed for vehicles to bypass the Sungam and Ramanathapuram Junctions to move towards Ukkadam, Townhall in the west and Singanallur and Coimbatore International Airport in the east. It was opened on 11 June 2022.

Background
The foundation stone for the flyover was laid in 2019. The flyover is built to reduce the traffic congestion caused in Trichy road. The flyover is planned to reduce traffic congestion in Ramanathapuram Junction and Sungam Junction.

Planning
The flyover is a four-laned overpass flyover bypassing the Ramanathapuram junction and Sungam junctions. Totally 119 pillars are for structural support. The flyover begins near Rainbow Colony and ends near the Coimbatore Stock Exchange in Trichy road. The flyover will have a dedicated exit ramp towards the Sungam Bypass Road to commute towards Ukkadam.

Construction 
The flyover is 3.2 km long and 17.2 metres wide. It was constructed at a cost of ₹ 232 crore and inaugurated on 11 June 2022. The initial construction started in 2019 and it was delayed in 2020 due to COVID-19 pandemic and accelerated in June 2020.

Decorations
Two pillars of the flyover were decorated with paintings of former Indian President APJ Abdul Kalam and freedom fighter VO Chidambaranar by digital painting method initially. It is also planned to paint the other pillars with the theme representing Coimbatore city.

See also
 Flyovers in Coimbatore
 Avinashi Road Expressway, Coimbatore
 Transport in Coimbatore
 Trichy road
 NH 81

References

Bridges in Tamil Nadu
Flyovers in Coimbatore